The National Rugby Championship, known as NRC, was an Australian rugby union competition. It was contested by eight teams, seven from Australia and one from Fiji. The tournament ran from 2014 until 2019 before being disbanded in 2020 following the change of the Australian rugby TV broadcasting deal from Fox Sports, who had funded the competition, to Stan Sport. The 2020 competition was cancelled due to the COVID-19 pandemic.

Format 
The National Rugby Championship was usually held between late August and early November. A round-robin tournament was scheduled first where each team played all others once. The top four teams progressed to the championship playoffs consisting of two semi-final knockout matches and a grand final to determine the champion team and winner of the NRC Trophy, nicknamed 'The Toast Rack'.

During the round-robin section of the tournament, teams would also play for the Horan-Little Shield, a challenge trophy put on the line by the holders when a challenge match was accepted or mandated according to the Shield rules.

Teams 
The teams that competed in the National Rugby Championship were. 

Notes

Television coverage and streaming
Two of the NRC matches each weekend were broadcast live via Fox Sports, with the remaining matches shown on the Fox Sports streaming platform. Discussion of the NRC competition was included on Fox Sports' review show NRC Extra Time on Monday nights, and the Kick & Chase program on Tuesday evenings.

History

In December 2013, the ARU announced that Australia would get another tier of competition under Super Rugby in line with South Africa’s Currie Cup and New Zealand's Mitre 10 Cup (then known as ITM Cup). Eleven bids were tendered from teams wanting to participate in the tournament, with nine being accepted. Applicants that were not successful were advised that they could bid again as the competition matured, as early as 2015.

The National Rugby Championship followed a previous national competition, the Australian Rugby Championship, that was abandoned after the first season in 2007 due to financial losses.

The construction company Buildcorp was the inaugural naming rights sponsor for the NRC competition, with other partners including Intercontinental Hotels, Qantas, and Allianz also signed. ASICS was the official apparel supplier for the first two seasons. Matches were played under approved law variations, intended to increase the speed of the game.

A new broadcasting deal agreed in 2015 secured the funding and future of the competition until the end of the 2020 season. The competition was reduced from nine teams to eight when the ARU did not renew the NRC licence for the Sydney Stars in 2016, citing insufficient player talent to support four competitive teams in New South Wales.

A team from Fiji, the Fijian Drua, joined the competition for the 2017 season. For the 2018 season, the Greater Sydney Rams were dropped from the competition, leaving Sydney with just one team, the Rays.

Sponsorship 
The tournament is run by Rugby Australia with the sponsorship of Foxtel which provides television coverage on its Fox Sports channels. Gilbert is the official supplier of all rugby balls.

Player selection 
Australia's Super Rugby players participate in the NRC under a capped allocation to ensure that all NRC teams have a mix of players from local development squads and club competitions, as well as those with Super Rugby experience. Australian national team players are required for Test match rugby during the NRC season, but each player is allocated to one of the NRC teams and is able to play if released from national duty.

Seasons

Results

Results summary

Results summary by region

See also 

 Australian Rugby Championship (predecessor competition)
 Australian Rugby Shield (defunct)
 Super Rugby
 Super W

References

External links 
 National Rugby Championship official homepage
 NRC on Fox Sports
 NRC Live on twitter.com

Archives

Team webpages 

 
2014 establishments in Australia
Australia
Professional sports leagues in Australia
National
Sports leagues established in 2014
Multi-national professional sports leagues
2020 disestablishments in Australia
Sports leagues disestablished in 2020